is a passenger railway station located in Aoba-ku, Yokohama, Kanagawa Prefecture, Japan, operated by the private railway company Tokyu Corporation.

Lines

Station layout 
The station consists of two opposed side platforms serving two tracks with the station building located underneath.

Platforms

History
Aobadai Station was opened on April 1, 1966. The station building was rebuilt from 1990–1992, and a new bus terminal was added.

Passenger statistics
In fiscal 2019, the station was used by an average of 110,999 passengers daily. 

The passenger figures for previous years are as shown below.

Surrounding area
Philia Hall (Aoba Ward Cultural Center)
Aobadai Park
Sakuradai Park
Yokohama City Aobadai Junior High School

See also
 List of railway stations in Japan

References

External links

 

Railway stations in Kanagawa Prefecture
Railway stations in Japan opened in 1966
Railway stations in Yokohama